Sur la Mer is the thirteenth album by The Moody Blues. It was released in 1988.   It features the hit single "I Know You're Out There Somewhere", a sequel to their 1986 hit "Your Wildest Dreams". Much of the music on the album would fit in the "synthpop" genre, though it does bear more rock and acoustic influences than its predecessor.

Flautist and vocalist Ray Thomas did not appear on the album, although he remained a member of the band at the time during which it was recorded.

Original track listing

Side One
"I Know You're Out There Somewhere" (Justin Hayward) – 6:37
"Want to Be with You" (Hayward, John Lodge) – 4:48
"River of Endless Love" (Hayward, Lodge) – 4:45
"No More Lies" (Hayward) – 5:13
"Here Comes the Weekend" (Lodge) – 4:13

Side Two
"Vintage Wine" (Hayward) – 3:38
"Breaking Point" (Hayward, Lodge) – 4:56
"Miracle" (Hayward, Lodge) – 4:56
"Love Is on the Run" (Lodge) – 5:00
"Deep" (Hayward) – 6:50

Personnel
Justin Hayward – vocals, guitars, keyboards, drum sequencing
John Lodge –  vocals, bass guitar, keyboards, drum sequencing
Graeme Edge – drums, percussion
Patrick Moraz – keyboards, synthesizers, arrangements

Production
Produced by Tony Visconti
Engineered & Mixed By Tony Visconti, Paul Cartledge & Sam Smith

Charts

Certifications

References

External links
"I Know You're Out There Somewhere" Music Video (YouTube)
"No More Lies" Music Video (YouTube)

Sur la Mer
Albums produced by Tony Visconti
Sur la Mer
Polydor Records albums